Miroslav Matiaško (born 14 July 1982) is a former Slovak biathlete.

Career
Matiaško debuted in the Biathlon World Cup in the relay in Brezno-Osrblie on 20 December 2002, and his first individual race was on 18 January 2003 in the 10 km sprint event in Ruhpolding. As of January 2015, he has earned one World Cup podium, in the mixed relay event at Kontiolahti in the 2011–12 season. His best individual performance is a 6th-place finish in the individual at the 2010–11 Pokljuka event.

His best overall finish in the World Cup was in 2010–11, placing 73rd. His best performance at a World Championships is 9th, in the 2008 relay. As an individual, his best performance is 32nd, in the 20 km individual in 2013. He also won a silver medal at the 2003 Junior World Championships, in the individual.

He competed in the 2006, 2010 and 2010 Winter Olympics for Slovakia. As of January 2015, his best finish was 12th, as a member of the Slovak relay team in 2014. His best individual performance was 38th, in the 2006 individual.

Matiaško retired from biathlon after the end of the 2015–16 season.

World Cup podiums

References

External links
 

1982 births
Living people
People from Handlová
Sportspeople from the Trenčín Region
Slovak male biathletes
Biathletes at the 2006 Winter Olympics
Biathletes at the 2010 Winter Olympics
Biathletes at the 2014 Winter Olympics
Olympic biathletes of Slovakia
Universiade bronze medalists for Slovakia
Universiade medalists in biathlon
Competitors at the 1999 Winter Universiade
Competitors at the 2005 Winter Universiade